Zogbaum is a surname. Notable people with the surname include:

Rufus Fairchild Zogbaum (1849–1925), American illustrator, journalist, and writer
Wilfrid Zogbaum (1915–1965), American painter and sculptor